The 1994–95 season was Paris Saint-Germain's 25th season in existence. PSG played their home league games at the Parc des Princes in Paris, registering an average attendance of 33,348 spectators per match. The club was presided by Michel Denisot and the team was coached by Luis Fernandez. David Ginola began the campaign as team captain, but Fernandez quickly gave the armband to Alain Roche.

Players 
As of the 1994–95 season.

Squad

Out on loan

Transfers 

As of the 1994–95 season.

Arrivals

Departures

Kits 

Spanish car manufacturer SEAT, French soft-drink brand Tourtel and British tea brand Lipton were the shirt sponsors. American sportswear brand Nike was the kit manufacturer.

Friendly tournaments

Pepsi Cup

Competitions

Overall record

Division 1

League table

Results by round

Matches

Coupe de France

Coupe de la Ligue

UEFA Champions League

Qualifying round

Group stage

Knockout phase

Quarter-finals

Semi-finals

Statistics 

As of the 1994–95 season.

Appearances and goals 

|-
!colspan="16" style="background:#dcdcdc; text-align:center"|Goalkeepers

|-
!colspan="16" style="background:#dcdcdc; text-align:center"|Defenders

|-
!colspan="16" style="background:#dcdcdc; text-align:center"|Midfielders

|-
!colspan="16" style="background:#dcdcdc; text-align:center"|Forwards

|-

References

External links 

Official websites
 PSG.FR - Site officiel du Paris Saint-Germain
 Paris Saint-Germain - Ligue 1 
 Paris Saint-Germain - UEFA.com

Paris Saint-Germain F.C. seasons
Paris Saint-Germain